Hubby's Day at Home is an American silent film produced by Kalem Company and directed by Sidney Olcott with Agnes Mapes and Jack J. Clark in the leading roles.

Cast
 Agnes Mapes - Wifie
 Jack J. Clark - Hubby

External links

 Hubby's Day at Home website dedicated to Sidney Olcott

1911 films
Silent American drama films
American silent short films
Films directed by Sidney Olcott
1911 short films
1911 drama films
American black-and-white films
1910s American films